Kwu Tung (Chinese: 古洞站) is a planned underground infill station on the Lok Ma Chau spur line of the  of the MTR rapid transit network in Hong Kong. The station will be situated near Kwu Tung in North District, New Territories. It will act as the terminus of the proposed .

History 
In 2001, KCR Corporation, then operator of the East Rail line (known then simply as "East Rail"), proposed a spur line that would reach the Lok Ma Chau checkpoint. A small area of land in Kwu Tung, an area in between Sheung Shui and Lok Ma Chau, was acquired by KCR for the construction of an underground station. When construction began in 2002, the length of the spur line was built using tunnel boring machines (TBMs) through Kwu Tung.  An underground station box structure was constructed through cut-and-cover, featuring the running tunnels running alongside an island platform. When the spur line finally opened in 2007, trains ran through the unfinished Kwu Tung station but never stopped there. While the station was never completed, in 2007, the design contractor Arup stated the retaining wall would be strong enough for any future construction works. Also, the structures on the edges of the unfinished platforms were strong enough for future installation of any platform screen doors. At present, the station only consists of an underground area excavated allowing for future platforms.

The Hong Kong Government investigation found that  of land in Kwu Tung North is available for development as part of the government's plan to increase the area's population by 114,300.

In 2021, MTR announced that Arup, the design contractor for the original station box, would be returning for the first phase of the Northern Link. The construction of the station was approved by the government in 2021, in anticipation of rising transport demand in the Kwu Tung North New Development Area. Construction is expected to start in 2023. East Rail Line trains are expected to start operating at this station in 2027. The station will serve as a major public transport hub in the northern New Territories when the Northern Link is completed in 2034.

Gallery

References

External links
Lok Ma Chau Spur Line
 

Sheung Shui
Kwu Tung
North District, Hong Kong
MTR stations in the New Territories
East Rail line
Proposed railway stations in Hong Kong